Henry Lawson (1867–1922) was an Australian writer and poet.

Henry Lawson may also refer to:

Sir Henry Lawson, 2nd Baronet (1663–1720), of the Lawson baronets
Sir Henry Lawson, 4th Baronet (1712–1781), of the Lawson baronets
Sir Henry Lawson, 6th Baronet (1750–1834), of the Lawson baronets
Henry Lawson (astronomer) (1774–1855), English astronomer
Sir Henry Merrick Lawson (1859–1933), British Army general
Henry Lawson (cricketer) (1865–1941), New Zealand cricketer
Sir Henry Joseph Lawson, 3rd Baronet (1877–1947), of the Lawson baronets
Geoff Lawson (cricketer) (born 1957), Australian cricketer, nicknamed "Henry" after the writer

See also
Harry Lawson (disambiguation)